Abbas Khan Afridi is a Pakistani politician and former Federal Minister of Textile Industry and a member of the Senate of Pakistan. He is the founder and CEO of Afridi Traders and holds shares in other projects. Afridi was also the second highest tax payer in the country in 2013. He is currently the joint secretary of PMLN.

Political career
He was elected to the Senate of Pakistan in March 2009 as an Independent candidate. He was sworn in as Federal Minister of Textile Industry on 19 March 2014. Afridi was also the second highest tax payer in the country in 2013. He is currently the joint secretary of PMLN.

References

Living people
Year of birth missing (living people)
Members of the Senate of Pakistan
Pashtun people